Guilherme da Trindade Dubas (born 1 May 2000), known as Guilherme Biro, is a Brazilian professional footballer who plays as a midfielder for Mirassol.

References

External links

2000 births
Living people
Footballers from Curitiba
Brazilian footballers
Association football midfielders
Campeonato Brasileiro Série A players
Coritiba Foot Ball Club players